Dakota Pass is a low pass in the Queen Elizabeth Range, to the east of Peletier Plateau. It was named by the New Zealand Geological Survey Antarctic Expedition (1961–62) because the pass was used by a Dakota R4D (new designation Skytrain C-47) plane on a reconnaissance flight into the area.

References
 

Mountain passes of the Ross Dependency
Shackleton Coast